"Every Night" is a debut song recorded by American country music artist Pake McEntire.  It was released in January 1986 as the first single from the album Too Old to Grow Up Now.  The song reached #20 on the Billboard Hot Country Singles & Tracks chart.  The song was written by Layng Martine, Jr.

Chart performance

References

1986 debut singles
1986 songs
Pake McEntire songs
Songs written by Layng Martine Jr.
Song recordings produced by Mark Wright (record producer)
RCA Records singles